Harding High School may refer to:

Fairport Harding High School (Fairport Harbor, Ohio)
Harding Academy (Memphis, Tennessee)
Harding Charter Preparatory High School (Oklahoma City, Oklahoma)
Harding Senior High School (St. Paul, Minnesota)
Harding University High School (Charlotte, North Carolina)
Marion Harding High School (Marion, Ohio)
Paul Harding High School (Fort Wayne, Indiana)
Warren Harding High School (Bridgeport, Connecticut)
Warren G. Harding High School (Warren, Ohio)